Niongho is a town in the Toece Department of Bazèga Province in central Burkina Faso. The town has a population of 1,026.

References

Populated places in the Centre-Sud Region
Bazèga Province